Sue Entlicher (born December 28, 1950) is an American politician who served in the Missouri House of Representatives from 2011 to 2017.

References

1950 births
Living people
Republican Party members of the Missouri House of Representatives
People from Hoisington, Kansas
20th-century American politicians
20th-century American women politicians
21st-century American women
Women state legislators in Missouri